The Eastern Visayas slender skink (Brachymeles samad) is a species of skink endemic to the Philippines.

References

Reptiles of the Philippines
Reptiles described in 2012
Brachymeles